Drljača is the Serbo-Croatian word for harrow, and is used as a surname and toponym (Drljača, Croatia). It may refer to:

Lazar Drljača, Yugoslav painter
Igor Drljaca, Bosnian-Canadian film director
Boro Drljača, Serbian singer
Simo Drljača, Bosnian Serb murderer and criminal, and a war-time commander in Prijedor
Stefan Drljača, German footballer

At least 279 individuals with the surname died at the Jasenovac concentration camp.

References

Serbian surnames